Alessio de Marchis or il Marchis (Naples, 1684–1752, Perugia) was an Italian painter of the early 18th century, active mainly in Rome and Urbino, mainly as a landscape painter.

Alessio was born in Naples, and was known to be active in 1710. He painted in the Palazzo Ruspoli and the Palazzo Albani in Rome. He was said to have been excellent at depictions of fires, and in attempting to paint one from nature, set up a damaging conflagration. For this, he apparently was sentenced to years as a galley slave, until he was pardoned under Pope Clement XI, for whom Alessio painted many canvases of perspective, landscape, and marinescapes. He was said to have been influenced by Salvatore Rosa and Claude Lorraine. His son was also a landscape artist.

Sources

Two attributed works at Pinacoteca Fortunato Duranti
 Paintings at Fondazione Cassa di Risparmio di Perugia

External links

17th-century Neapolitan people
1684 births
1752 deaths
17th-century Italian painters
Italian male painters
18th-century Italian painters
Italian Baroque painters
Painters from Naples
Italian landscape painters
18th-century Italian male artists